Fractal burning, Lichtenberg burning or wood fracking refers to a technique where a Lichtenberg figure is burnt into wood using high voltage electricity. It has gained notoriety due to numerous incidents of death or severe injuries when people have attempted it at home, with at least 33 people having died between 2017 and 2022.

Process 

By applying a coat of electrolytic solution to the surface of the wood, the resistance of the surface drops considerably. Two electrodes are then placed on the wood and a high voltage is passed across them. Current from the electrodes will cause the surface of the wood to heat up until the electrolyte boils and the wooden surface burns. Because the charred surface of the wood is mildly conductive, the surface of the wood will burn in a pattern outwards from the electrodes.

Safety 

The danger lies in the process relying on high voltages, much higher than normal mains electricity. High voltages enable a potentially fatal current to pass through the body. The slightest contact with the equipment involved may result in death. At such high voltages, arc flashes are also a risk.

Transformers from microwave ovens are frequently used for the technique because they are easily obtainable. They can produce voltages between 1,000 and 15,000 volts (2,000 volts is used by the modern electric chair, a device used to execute an individual by electrocution), and a fatal current of between 500 and 2,000 milliamps. Even a tenth or a hundredth of that current could be fatal. Because of the galvanic isolation in the transformer, a ground fault circuit interrupter (GFCI) or residual-current device (RCD) will not be able to break the circuit in the event of an electric shock.

A 2020 review noted that the mortality rate of fractal wood burning cases was "significant" and "exceedingly high." The American Association of Woodturners has, on safety grounds, banned any demonstrations or sales related to the practice at its events, strongly discourages any of its chapters from promoting the practice, and refuses to publish information about the practice other than safety warnings. The Association of Woodturners of Great Britain has instituted the same policy.

Other organisations that have warned against the practice include:

 Burn and Reconstructive Centers of America
 The Electrical Safety Authority of Ontario
 Electrical Safety Foundation International
 WorkSafe New Zealand
 The South Australia electrical safety regulator
 The Western Australia electrical safety regulator

References

External links 
 Video discussing the dangers of fractal wood burning by Ann Reardon

Artistic techniques
Electrical safety
Woodworking techniques